Barre is a town in Worcester County, Massachusetts, United States. The population was 5,530 at the 2020 census.

History

Originally called the Northwest District of Rutland, it was first settled by Europeans in 1720. The town was incorporated as a district on June 17, 1774, as Hutchinson after Thomas Hutchinson, colonial governor of Massachusetts. Eventually, along with 41 other districts in the state, they were all incorporated on August 23, 1775 by the Massachusetts Court. The next year on November 7, 1776, it was renamed Barre  in honor of Colonel Isaac Barré, an Irish-born MP who was a champion of American Independence. Starting in the 1800s, the Boston, Barre and Gardner Railroad provided rail service to the town.  "This township was originally known as Rutland, West District; but prior to 1770 its name was changed to "Hutchinson", in honor of the Hon. Thomas Hutchinson who was Lieutenant Governor of Massachusetts in 1765, became acting Governor in 1769, and Governor in 1770. When, in 1774, on account of his Tory proclivities, Governor Hutchinson resigned his office and went to England, his name and memory were so execrated by the patriots of the township of Hutchinson that, in 1776, the General Assembly of Massachusetts changed the name of the township to "Barré."

Geography
Barre is drained by the Ware River.

Barre is bordered by Hubbardston to the northeast, Rutland and Oakham to the southeast, New Braintree to the south, Hardwick to the southwest, Petersham to the northwest, and a small portion of Phillipston to the north.

Demographics

As of the census of 2000, there were 5,113 people, 1,889 households, and 1,377 families residing in the town. The racial makeup of the town was 97.63% White, 0.51% Black or African American, 0.10% Native American, 0.33% Asian, 0.29% from other races, and 1.13% from two or more races. Of the population, 0.80% were Hispanic or Latino of any race.

There were 1,889 households, out of which 36.5% had children under the age of 18 living with them, 58.9% were married couples living together, 9.8% had a female householder with no husband present, and 27.1% were non-families. Of all households, 22.8% were made up of individuals, and 10.3% had someone living alone who was 65 years of age or older. The average household size was 2.69 and the average family size was 3.17.

In the town, the population was spread out, with 28.4% under the age of 18, 5.7% from 18 to 24, 31.0% from 25 to 44, 22.3% from 45 to 64, and 12.7% who were 65 years of age or older. The median age was 37 years. For every 100 females, there were 96.1 males. For every 100 females age 18 and over, there were 95.7 males.

The median income for a household in the town was $50,553, and the median income for a family was $56,069. Males had a median income of $40,284 versus $29,250 for females. The per capita income for the town was $20,476. 3.4% of the population and 1.2% of families were below the poverty line. Out of the total population, 1.5% of those under the age of 18 and 2.6% of those 65 and older were living below the poverty line.

Education

Barre is part of the Quabbin Regional School District along with, Hardwick, Hubbardston, New Braintree, and Oakham. Elementary School Students attend Ruggles Lane Elementary School, from grades K–6, middle school students attend Quabbin Regional Middle School from grades 7–8, and high school students attend Quabbin Regional High School from grades 9–12. It is also home to the administrative offices (including the office of the superintendent) of the Quabbin Regional School District.

From 1840 into the twentieth century, it was home to the Elm Hill Private School and Home for the Education of Feeble-Minded Youth.

Barre is home to Stetson School.

Government

Sites of interest
 Barre Historical Society & Museum
 Barre Players Theater
 Insight Meditation Society
 Russell's Fossil Museum

Notable people
 David Oliver Allen, missionary and author
 Stephen Brewer, state senator
 Ebenezer Childs, pioneer and legislator
 Timothy Jenkins, congressman
 Walker Lewis, black abolitionist, Masonic Grand Master of African Grand Lodge #1, and Mormon Elder
 John Murray (Massachusetts), Representative to the Great and General Court of the Province of Massachusetts Bay for Rutland's Northwest District
 Joseph B. Plummer, general
 Jacob Riis, journalist, author of How the Other Half Lives
 Daniel Ruggles, Confederate general

References

 Hayward's New England Gazetteer of 1839

External links

 Town of Barre, Massachusetts
 Woods Memorial Library

 
1720 establishments in Massachusetts
Populated places established in 1720
Towns in Massachusetts
Towns in Worcester County, Massachusetts